Omkareshwar (IAST: Ōṃkārēśvar) is a Hindu temple dedicated to Shiva, located in Mandhata, nearby Khandwa city in Khandwa district of the Indian state of Madhya Pradesh. It is one of the 12 revered Jyotirlinga shrines of Shiva. centuries ago the Bhil tribe settled people on this place and now this place is famous for its grandeur and history. It is on an island called Mandhata, near Khandwa city in the Narmada river at Khandwa district in Madhya Pradesh, India; the shape of the island is said to be like the Devanagari ॐ symbol.

There are two main temples of Lord Shiva here, one to Omkareshwar (whose name means "Lord of Omkara or the Lord of the Om sound") located in the island and one to Mamleshwar (Amaleshwar) (whose name means "Immortal Lord" or "lord of the Immortals or Devas") located on the south bank of Narmada River on the mainland.

Madhya Pradesh has two Jyotirlingas, the second one, Mahakaleshwar Jyotirlinga, is situated about 140 km north of Omkareshwar Jyotirlinga.

Jyotirlinga 
As per Shiv Mahapuran, once Brahma (the Hindu God of creation) and Vishnu (the Hindu God of Protection and Care) had an argument in terms of supremacy of creation. To test them, Shiva pierced the three worlds as a huge endless pillar of light, the jyotirlinga.  Vishnu and Brahma split their ways to downwards and upwards respectively to find the end of the light in either directions. Brahma lied that he found out the end, while Vishnu conceded his defeat.  Shiva appeared as the second pillar of light and cursed Brahma that he would have no place in ceremonies while Vishnu would be worshipped until the end of eternity.  The jyotirlinga is the supreme partless reality, out of which Shiva partly appears.  The jyothirlinga shrines, thus are places where Shiva appeared as a fiery column of light. Originally there were believed to be 64 jyothirlingas while 12 of them are considered to be very auspicious and holy. Each of the twelve jyothirlinga sites take the name of the presiding deity – each considered different manifestation of Shiva. At all these sites, the primary image is lingam representing the beginningless and endless Stambha pillar, symbolizing the infinite nature of Shiva.

The twelve jyothirlingas are Somnath in Gujarat, Mallikarjuna at Srisailam in Andhra Pradesh, Mahakaleswar at Ujjain in Madhya Pradesh, Omkareshwar in Khandwa in Madhya Pradesh, Kedarnath in Himalayas, in Uttrakhand state, Bhimashankar in Maharashtra, Viswanath at Varanasi in Uttar Pradesh, Triambakeshwar near Nashik in Maharashtra, Vaidyanath Temple, Vaidyanath in Jharkhand, Nageshwar at Dwarika in Gujarat, Rameshwar at Rameswaram in Tamil Nadu and Grishneshwar near Aurangabad, Maharashtra in Maharashtra.

Legends and history 
As per Hindu legend, Vindhya, the deity controlling the Vindhyachal mountain range was worshipping Shiva to propitiate himself from the sins committed. He created a sacred geometrical diagram and a Lingam made of sand and clay. Shiva was pleased with the worship and believed to have appeared in two forms, namely Omkareshwar and Amaleswara. Since the mud mound appeared in the form of Om, the island came to be known as Omkareswar. There is a shrine for Parvati and Ganapati in the temple.

The second story relates to Mandhata and his son's penance. King Mandhata of Ikshvaku clan (an ancestor of Lord Ram) worshipped Lord Shiva here until the Lord manifested himself as a Jyotirlinga. Some scholars also narrate the story about Mandhata's sons-Ambarish and Muchukunda, who had practiced severe penance and austerities here and pleased Lord Shiva. Because of this, the mountain is named Mandhata.

The third story from Hindu scriptures says that once upon a time there was a great war between Devas (gods) and Danavas (demons), in which Danavas won. This was a major setback for Devas and hence Devas prayed to Lord Shiva. Pleased with their prayer, Lord Shiva emerged in the form of Omkareshwar Jyotirlinga and defeated Danavas.

Philosophy of Omkaar - Advait Matt says Omkaar is composed of two words, Om (sound) and Akaar (srishti). Both are one not two since Advait means "not two". Om beej mantra of Srishti, itself is creator of Srishti.

Adi Shankara's Cave – Omkareshwar is said to be the place where Adi Sankara met his guru Govinda Bhagavatpada in a cave. This cave can be found even today just below the Shiva temple where an image of Adi Shankara has been installed.

Location 
It is situated in the Mandhata city (also known as Omkareshwar) in Khandwa district of Madhya Pradesh state in India. It is about 16 km from Barwaha in Madhya Pradesh. Omkareshwar is formed by the sacred river Narmada. This is one of the most sacred rivers in India and is now home to one of the world's biggest dam projects. The temple is situated on Mandhata or Shivpuri island on the banks of Narmada and river Kaveri (a tributary of Narmada).

Connectivity
Nearest Airport: Indore

Nearest Railway Station: Khandwa Junction and Mhow

Gallery

See also 
Mahakaleshwar Jyotirlinga

References

Notes 

 
 
 .

External links 

 Official Website
 Google Earth view

Shiva temples in Madhya Pradesh
Jyotirlingas
Tourist attractions in Khandwa district
Religious tourism
Religious tourism in India
Hindu pilgrimages
Hindu pilgrimage sites
Hindu pilgrimage sites in India